Luis Aguilar Manzo (29 January 1918 – 24 October 1997) was a Mexican film and television actor and singer. He was also known as El Gallo Giro, and was noted for his performances in films as El 7 leguas (1955) and El látigo negro (1958).

Aguilar was born in Hermosillo, Sonora, Mexico. He was given his first leading role in the film Sota, Caballo y Rey (1944). He had two daughters (Anna Luisa y Martha Fernanda Aguilar) from his first marriage, and one son (Luis Aguilar Doblado) from his second marriage with Rosario Gálvez. He died on 24 October 1997 in his sleep.

Selected filmography

 I'm a Real Mexican (1942)
 Adventure in the Night (1948)
 What Has That Woman Done to You? (1951)
 Full Speed Ahead (1951)
 The Masked Tiger (1951)
 Made for Each Other (1953)
 The Bandits of Cold River (1956)
 Here Are the Aguilares! (1957)
 Music and Money (1958)
 The Boxer (1958)
 It Happened in Mexico (1958)
 Black Skull (1960)
 Northern Courier (1960)
 My Wedding Night (1961)

External links

1918 births
1997 deaths
20th-century Mexican male actors
Golden Age of Mexican cinema
Ranchera singers